Saveasiuleo is the God of Pulotu (Old concept of Heaven) the underworld of spirits or Hades in Samoan mythology.

He is the father of Nafanua the Goddess of War in Samoa. Nafanua's mother is Tilafaiga, the sister of Taema another figure of Samoan mythology.

Saveasiuleo is sometimes referred to as Elo.

The spirits of gods were able to take the form of animals and human beings and Saveasiuleo is believed to take the form of an eel or appear as half man and half eel. His ancestors were rocks. One story says that his mother was Taufa and his father, Aloa. His brothers were Salevao and Ulufanuaseesee. The brothers agreed that Saveasiuleo would go and become king in Pulotu. Saveasiuleo would come up from his kingdom and wander the earth. There are different versions of stories told about him. He is referred to as a god and sometimes as a demon. One day Saveasiuleo met his twin nieces Tilafaiga and Taema swimming back to Samoa from Fiti where they had learned the art of tattooing. Saveasiuleo abducted Tilafaiga and she later gave birth to Nafanua, the goddess of war. The story of the sisters bringing a basket of tattoo tools for the pea to Samoa is another well known legend.

Pulotu
According to Samoan beliefs, the entrance into the spirit world Pulotu is at the village of Falealupo, at the western end of the island of Savaii.

See also
Havea Hikuleo
Polynesian mythology

References

Samoan deities
Underworld gods